This article lists people who have been featured on Malta postage stamps, listed by their name, the year they were first featured on a stamp, and a short description of their notability. Several of these people have been featured on multiple stamps.

For the purpose of this list, "featured" may mean:
 The likeness of a person,
 The name of a person, or
 People who have neither their likeness nor name on a stamp, but are documented by MaltaPost as being the subject of a stamp.

A 
Veneranda Abela – Maltese baroness (1998)
Giovanni Francesco Abela – Maltese historian (2005)
Karmenu Abela – Maltese Sette Giugno victim (1985)
Agatha of Sicily – Christian saint (1965)
Carmela Agius – Maltese laundress (2003)
Hans Christian Andersen – Danish author (2005)
Andrew the Apostle – Christian saint (2019)
Anthony of Antioch – Christian saint (1998)
Manwel Attard – Maltese Sette Giugno victim (1985)
Emmanuel Attard Bezzina – Maltese politician (1975)
Francesco Azzopardi – Maltese composer (1985)
Michael Azzopardi – Maltese philanthropist (2005)

B 
Robert Baden-Powell – British military officer, founder of scouting (2007)
Alexander Ball – British naval officer, Civil Commissioner of Malta (1999)
Ġużeppi Bajada – Maltese Sette Giugno victim (1985)
Nicolo Baldacchino – Maltese tenor (1985)
Giuseppe Barth – Maltese-Austrian ophthalmologist (1974)
Bartholomew the Apostle – Christian saint (2021)
Franz Beckenbauer – German footballer and coach (2006)
Laurie Bellizzi – Maltese entertainer (2019)
Benedict XVI – German Pope (2010)
Ludwig van Beethoven – German composer and pianist (2020)
Diego Bonanno – Maltese priest and philanthropist (1986)
Napoleon Bonaparte – French military and political leader (1998)
Francis Bonnici – Maltese priest and philanthropist (2007)
Joe Borg – Maltese Foreign Minister (2004)
 – Maltese botanist (1974)
George Borg Olivier – Prime Minister of Malta (1989)
John Bosco – Italian priest, Christian saint (2004)
Rużar Briffa – Maltese poet (1980)
David Bruce – Australian-British pathologist and microbiologist (1966)
Vincenzo Bugeja – Maltese businessman and philanthropist (1986)
George H. W. Bush – President of the United States (1989)
Anton Buttigieg – President of Malta (1974)
Lord Byron – English poet (1990)

C 
Giuseppe Calì – Maltese painter (1996)
Joseph Calleia – Maltese-American actor and singer (1997)
Nazzareno Camilleri – Maltese philosopher (1996)
Gregorio Carafa – Hospitaller Grand Master (2014)
Girolamo Cassar – Maltese architect and military engineer (1966)
Saverio Cassar – Maltese priest, Governor of Gozo (2002)
Jean de la Cassière – Hospitaller Grand Master (2014)
Johnny Catania – Maltese entertainer (2019)
Catherine of Alexandria – Christian saint (2005)
Catherine of Siena – Christian saint (1967)
Caroline Cauchi – Maltese philanthropist (2007)
Pietru Caxaro – Maltese philosopher and poet (1985)
Bobby Charlton – English footballer (2006)
Christopher – Christian saint (1976)
Winston Churchill – Prime Minister of the United Kingdom (1966)
Adelaide Cini – Maltese philanthropist (1986)
Annet de Clermont-Gessant – Hospitaller Grand Master (2014)
Charles Clews – Maltese entertainer (2019)
Samuel Taylor Coleridge – English poet, literary critic, philosopher, and theologian (1990)
Christopher Columbus – Italian explorer (1992)
Nicolas Cotoner – Hospitaller Grand Master (1964)
Raphael Cotoner – Hospitaller Grand Master (2014)
Jacques Cousteau – French diver (1997)
Anastasio Cuschieri – Maltese priest and poet (1988)

D 
Dante Alighieri – Italian poet (1965)
Giuseppe De Piro – Maltese missionary (1983)
Ramon Despuig – Hospitaller Grand Master (2014)
Carlo Diacono – Maltese composer (2006)
Adrian Dingli – Chief Justice of Malta (2002)
Dominic – Castilian priest, Christian saint (2018)
Henry Dunant – Swiss humanitarian, businessman and activist, founder of the Red Cross (2013)
Wenzu Dyer – Maltese Sette Giugno victim (1985)

E 
Edward VII – British monarch (1903)
Dwight D. Eisenhower – American general, President of the United States (2018)
Elizabeth – Biblical figure (2021)
Elizabeth – British queen consort (1937)
Elizabeth II – British monarch (1950)

F 
Nazju Falzon – Maltese cleric (1988)
Eddie Fenech Adami – President of Malta (2004)
Sidor Formosa – Maltese priest (1988)
Francis – Argentine Pope (2022)
Francis of Assisi – Italian priest, Christian saint (1986)

G 
Gaetano dei Conti di Thiene – Italian priest and reformer, Christian saint (2018)
Alfons Maria Galea – Maltese writer (1986)
Galileo Galilei – Italian astronomer, physicist and engineer (2009)
Mohandas Karamchand Gandhi – Indian independence leader (1969)
Tomás Gargallo – Spanish Bishop of Malta, education pioneer (1997)
Martin Garzez – Hospitaller Grand Master (2014)
Bob Geldof – Irish singer-songwriter, actor and activist (2006)
George – Christian saint (2003)
George V – British monarch (1914)
George VI – British monarch (1937)
Gerard – founder of the Knights Hospitaller (2013)
Nosi Ghirlando – Maltese entertainer (2019)
Mikhail Gorbachev – Soviet leader (1989)
Lord Gort – Governor of Malta (1993)
Gregory – Christian saint (1998)
Maria Amelia Grognet – Maltese noblewoman (1998)
Robert Guiscard – Norman adventurer and warrior (2009)

H 
Holofernes – Biblical figure (1975)
Juan de Homedes y Coscon – Hospitaller Grand Master (2014)
Ferdinand von Hompesch zu Bolheim – Hospitaller Grand Master (1998)

I 
Ignatius of Loyola – Spanish priest and theologian, Christian saint (1991)
Nicolas Isouard – Maltese-French composer (1971)

J 
Jerome – Christian saint (1970)
Jesus (1951)
John the Baptist – Christian saint (1967)
John of the Cross – Spanish priest, Christian saint (1991)
John XXIII – Italian Pope, Christian saint (2014)
John Paul II – Polish Pope, Christian saint (1990)
Elton John – British singer, pianist and composer (2003)
Joseph – Christian saint (1964)
Judith – Biblical figure (1975)
Julian the Hospitaller – Christian saint (2018)

K 
John F. Kennedy – President of the United States (1966)
Athanasius Kircher – German scholar and polymath (2002)
Oreste Kirkop – Maltese tenor (2002)

L 
Philippe Villiers de L'Isle-Adam – Hospitaller Grand Master (1938)
Albert Laferla – Maltese education pioneer (1997)
Francesco Laparelli – Italian architect and military engineer (1966)
Egidio Lapira – Maltese dentist (2005)
Giovanni Paolo Lascaris – Hospitaller Grand Master (2014)
Lawrence – Christian saint (2019)
William D. Leahy – American naval officer (2015)

M 
The Magi – Biblical figures (1965)
Manuel Magri – Maltese ethnographer, archaeologist and writer (2007)
Anthony Mamo – President of Malta (1974)
Guglielmo Marconi – Italian inventor (1996)
Mary (1951)
Michael – archangel (1976)
Dom Mintoff – Prime Minister of Malta (1974)
Giorgio Mitrovich – Maltese activist (1985)
Pierre de Monte – Hospitaller Grand Master (2014)
Wolfgang Amadeus Mozart – German composer (2006)

N 
Paul Nani – Maltese composer (2006)
Johnny Navarro – Maltese entertainer (2019)
Nicholas – Christian saint (1976)

O 
Walter Oxley – British military officer (2018)

P 
Carmelo Pace – Maltese composer (2006)
Arvid Pardo – Maltese-Swedish diplomat and scholar (1987)
Louis Pasteur – French chemist and microbiologist (1995)
Paul the Apostle – Christian saint (1899)
Antoine de Paule – Hospitaller Grand Master (2014)
Pelé – Brazilian footballer (2006)
Mary Euphrasia Pelletier – French nun, Christian saint (1996)
Ramon Perellos y Roccaful – Hospitaller Grand Master (2014)
Peter – Christian saint (1967)
Philip – British prince, Duke of Edinburgh (2003)
Philip of Agira – Christian saint (2019)
Manuel Pinto da Fonseca – Hospitaller Grand Master (1969)
Padre Pio – Italian friar and mystic, Christian saint (2018)
Maria Adeodata Pisani – Maltese nun (1991)
Pius V – Italian Pope, Christian saint (1966)
Piero de Ponte – Hospitaller Grand Master (2014)
George Preca – Maltese priest, Christian saint (1980)
Mattia Preti – Italian artist (2013)
Luigi Preziosi – Maltese politician and ophthalmologist (1988)
Karm Psaila – Maltese priest and poet (1971)
Publius – Christian saint (1926)
Paolo Pullicino – Maltese priest and education pioneer (1997)

R 
Raphael – archangel (1998)
Martin de Redin – Hospitaller Grand Master (2014)
Roger I – Norman Count of Sicily (2009)
Emmanuel de Rohan-Polduc – Hospitaller Grand Master (2014)
Franklin D. Roosevelt – President of the United States (2015)

S 
Didier de Saint-Jaille – Hospitaller Grand Master (2014)
Robert Samut – Maltese doctor and musician (1969)
Michelangelo Sapiano – Maltese clockmaker (1995)
Pietru Pawl Saydon – Maltese priest, scholar and Bible translator (1988)
Antonio Sciortino – Maltese sculptor (1971)
Walter Scott – Scottish writer and historian (1990)
Claude de la Sengle – Hospitaller Grand Master (2014)
Inez Soler – Maltese artist, musician and writer (1996)
Joseph Stalin – Soviet leader (2015)
Heinrich von Stephan – German postal reformer (1974)
Sting – English musician, singer-songwriter and actor (2006)
Mabel Strickland – Anglo-Maltese journalist, newspaper proprietor and politician (1996)

T 
 – Italian postal reformer (2020)
Arthur Tedder – British military officer (2018)
William Makepeace Thackeray – British novelist, author and illustrator (1990)
Thomas of Villanova – Spanish friar, Christian saint (1967)

U 
Armando Urso – Maltese entertainer (2019)

V 
Jean Parisot de Valette – Hospitaller Grand Master (1962)
Luís Mendes de Vasconcellos – Hospitaller Grand Master (2014)
Mikiel Anton Vassalli – Maltese writer, philosopher and linguist (1980)
Paolino Vassallo – Maltese composer (2006)
Claude-Henri Belgrand de Vaubois – French general (1999)
Venera – Christian saint (2019)
Hugues Loubenx de Verdalle – Hospitaller Grand Master (2014)
Emily de Vialar – French nun and education pioneer (1997)
Victoria – British monarch (1860)
António Manoel de Vilhena – Hospitaller Grand Master (2014)
Emmanuele Vitale – Maltese rebel leader, Governor of Gozo (2002)

W 
Adrien de Wignacourt – Hospitaller Grand Master (2014)
Alof de Wignacourt – Hospitaller Grand Master (2014)

X 
Mikiel Xerri – Maltese patriot (1999)
Francisco Ximénez de Tejada – Hospitaller Grand Master (2014)

Z 
Giuseppe Zammit – Maltese professor (1976)
Themistocles Zammit – Maltese doctor and archaeologist (1966)
Dino Zoff – Italian goalkeeper (2006)
Marc'Antonio Zondadari – Hospitaller Grand Master (2014)

People commemorated but not depicted on Malta stamps
Geronimo Abos – Maltese composer (2005)
Henry Mayo Bateman – British artist and cartoonist (2012)
Giuseppe Callus (2005)
Albrecht Dürer – German painter, printmaker, and theorist (1978)
Melchiorre Gafà – Maltese sculptor (1967)
Edward Lear – English artist, illustrator, musician, author and poet (2012)
Giovanni Pietro Francesco Agius de Soldanis – Maltese historian (1971)

See also
Stamp collecting
Philately
List of philatelic bureaus

References

External links
Maltapost plc

Malta
Stamps
Philately of Malta
Stamps